WVRA (107.3 FM') is a radio station broadcasting a Religious format. Licensed to serve Enfield, North Carolina, United States, the station is currently licensed to Liberty University, Inc.

References

External links

Gospel radio stations in the United States
Radio stations established in 2007
Liberty University
VRA